Fictibacillus gelatini is a bacterium from the genus of Fictibacillus which has been isolated from contaminated 
gelatin in Belgium.

References

External links 

Type strain of Fictibacillus gelatini at BacDive -  the Bacterial Diversity Metadatabase

Bacillaceae
Bacteria described in 2004